Minnesota State Highway 610 (MN 610) is an east–west freeway in the Twin Cities region of Minnesota. The freeway connects Interstate 94 (I-94),  County Road 81 (CR 81), and CR 130 in northern Hennepin County to U.S. Highway 10 (US 10) in southern Anoka County. MN 610 crosses the Mississippi River on the Richard P. Braun Bridge between suburban Brooklyn Park and Coon Rapids.

The freeway was authorized in 1975, and most of the sections were completed by 2000; the  section westward to CR 81 in Maple Grove was completed and opened in 2011. The Minnesota Department of Transportation (MnDOT) opened the last segment extending to I-94 on December 9, 2016.

Route description
MN 610 starts at a partial interchange with I-94/US 52 in Maple Grove; eastbound traffic on I-94/southbound US 52 can exit to MN 610, and westbound traffic on MN 610 merges onto westbound I-94/northbound US 52. From there, the freeway continues eastward through an interchange with Maple Grove Parkway, and it turns southeasterly to its interchange with CR 81 in Maple Grove. From this point, the freeway runs eastbound through the northern suburbs of the Twin Cities. MN 610 is four lanes in width and has several interchanges with local streets and county roads before expanding to six lanes and meeting the northern terminus of MN 252 on the west bank of the Mississippi River. After MN 252 interchange, the MN 610 freeway turns to the northeast and crosses the Mississippi River on the dual-span, eight-lane Richard P. Braun Bridge.

Across the river, the freeway runs along the south side of the Coon Rapids Dam Regional Park before curving around to the east. It continues through suburban Coon Rapids as a six-lane freeway to a partial interchange with northbound MN 47. This interchange is used by eastbound traffic transitioning to westbound US 10.  The final section east to US 10 in Blaine is four lanes. The second interchange along this section of the freeway with University Avenue is used to connect with MN 47 southbound. The last interconnected interchange is at the eastern terminus as traffic defaults onto US 10 eastbound.

Legally, MN 610 is defined as Route 333 in the Minnesota Statutes § 161.115(264). The highway is not marked with this legislative route number along the actual highway. The entire route of MN 610 has been listed on the National Highway System, a system of roads important to the nation's economy, defense, and mobility.

History

MN 610 was proposed in the middle of the 1960s as a "North Crosstown" freeway. Studies for the highway started in the 1970s. The highway was first authorized on June 2, 1975. The westbound span of the Mississippi River bridge was built in 1985, and, along with the existing freeway east of MN 252, was opened in October 1987. Officials in Minnesota proposed tolls as a means to fund the construction on the highway in 1989. Local officials supported the highway construction, but opposed the tolling plans.

West of MN 252, the freeway construction started in June 1997. The freeway was opened to traffic in 2000, with a traffic light at the intersection of MN 610 and US 169 initially. Construction on the second bridge over the Mississippi River for eastbound traffic started in 1999, to be completed in 2002.

Construction of the portion between US 169 and CR 81 was estimated to cost $48 million in 2010, of which $27 million is being funded by federal stimulus money. The project began in October 2009, and it was scheduled to be completed in July 2011. The remainder of the highway to I-94 was not on a MnDOT schedule to be built. The new western terminus was to be located at Elm Creek Boulevard in Maple Grove. The freeway continued westward from this point in the median of CR 81, but this section was to be an unused stub end past the ramps that connect to CR 81 During the 2011 Minnesota state government shutdown, construction on MN 610 was halted for 20 days. Until work stopped on July 1, 2011, a ribbon-cutting ceremony had been scheduled to open the new freeway section on July 12. The ribbon cutting ceremony was on August 17 and the road opened on  August 19.

MN 610 was originally planned to extend west to I-94 in Maple Grove, and the freeway's mile markers reflected these plans, with the zero point calibrated to this terminus. A portion of this section is very unusual; it is routed down the middle of the median of CR 81 in Maple Grove, forming a roadway within a roadway.

On April 4, 2016, construction started on an interchange with Maple Grove Parkway. The final segment to I-94 opened on December 9, 2016.

Future
MnDOT officials have plans to extend MN 610 westward to connect to CR 30 in Corcoran, and officials are working to secure funding to build the missing ramps at the I-94/US 52 interchange.

Exit list

See also

References

External links

 MN 610 at The Unofficial Minnesota Highways Page

610
Freeways in the United States
U.S. Route 10
Transportation in Hennepin County, Minnesota
Transportation in Anoka County, Minnesota